Di Baglu (also Romanized as Dī Baglū; also known as Dabakloo, Debaglū, Debaklū, Debīglū, Dībaklū, Dībeklū, Ţebāqlī, and Tibagli) is a village in Mavazekhan-e Shomali Rural District, Khvajeh District, Heris County, East Azerbaijan Province, Iran. At the 2006 census, its population was 193, in 35 families.

References 

Populated places in Heris County